Hestur is a village in Hestur, Faroe Islands.

Populated places in the Faroe Islands